Blady was a five-member South Korean girl group originally formed by SY6 Entertainment and later produced by Star Planet. The group released the pre-debut retro-inspired single "찌릿찌릿 (Spark Spark)" on May 16, 2011 and their title track "미친 날 (Crazy Day)" on July 27, 2011.

History

2011: Debut, "Spark Spark", and "Crazy Day"
In 2011, Blady made their debut with four members: Darae, Bunhong, Sunyeong and Kangyoon. The group released the pre-debut single "찌릿찌릿 (Spark Spark)", on May 16, 2011. As early rookies they received praises from hit composer Shinsadong Tiger, who's known for producing for Beast and 4minute, as he saw in their training process that their "passion and skills" stood above many other girl groups debuting at the time. He went on to say, "In anticipation for their debut, the members have been sleeping three hours a night in order to devote everything else to their rehearsals."

Their official title track, titled "미친 날 (Crazy Day)", was released on July 27, 2011. The music video for "Crazy Day" was shot in 3D in the Maldives by director Kang Young Man. The clip also featured dance moves choreographed by Main Spirit who has also worked with Lee Hyori and Bada.

At the end of their debuting year, the girls took home the 2011 19th Republic of Korea Culture Entertainment Awards Idol Music Rookie of the Year award. Also, SY6 added a new member, Nahyun.

2013–2014: Line-up changes, "Blood Type B Girl", and Blady Soul
Despite rumors of disbandment in 2012 and early 2013, Blady released a single "B형 여자 (Blood Type B Girl)" on November 18, 2013. The group returned with five members, Kangyoon being the only first generation member to return. Thus, she was promoted to leader status in the group. This comeback saw the addition of new members Coco, Tina, Yeji and Soojin.

The single release of "B형 여자 (Blood Type B Girl)" also saw a new remixed version of "미친 날 (Crazy Day)" titled "Bring Bring" with a stronger hip hop and rock flavor than its predecessor. "B형 여자 (Blood Type B Girl)" is a collaboration between renowned producer C-Luv (who has produced for Rain, MBLAQ and Kim Hyun Joong) and songwriter Stay Tuned. The song features a funky urban electronic beat and draws inspiration from the fact that all the members of Blady have blood type B.

Blady Soul was the first special unit to come from Blady, consisting of members Yeji and Soojin. The duo released a digital single, "떠나가지마 (Please Don't Leave Me)", to commemorate White Day. The song garnered attention for its smooth R&B style in contrast to Blady's normal bubblegum-pop style.

In late 2014, it was revealed that members Coco, Kangyoon, and Yeji had left the group.

2015–2017: Line-up changes, Renovation, "Secret Number" and disbandment
In March 2015, it was revealed that member Soojin had also left Blady. Not long after, Star Planet announced that the group would be making another comeback as a five-member group. Along with Tina, there would be four new members, Giru, Dayeong, Yeeun, and Gabin, added to Blady's lineup.

A showcase was held on March 9, 2015 in Seoul to kick off promotions for their mini album 'Renovation'. On March 30, 2015, Blady released their music video for "Come to Me", the title track for Renovation, featuring the new lineup.

On July 27, 2015, Blady released a special summer single entitled "Secret Number(비밀열쇠)". The first version of the music video was released the same day on both Blady's and 1THEK's official YouTube channels, and the second version was released on October 19 of the same year. Blady began promotions for "Secret Number(비밀열쇠)" the following week the song was released.

Member Giru released a solo project single, Blady Solo Part.1 - Spring Love Scent (봄 사랑향기) ft Unplugboy (언플러그보이), on April 29, 2016.

On October 20, 2017, the members all made farewell posts on Instagram, saying the group had disbanded.

Members

Former
Darae (다래)
Bunhong (분홍)
Sunyeong (선영)
Nahyun (나현)
Coco (코코)
Kangyoon (강윤)
Yeji (예지)
Soojin (수진)
Gabin (가빈)
Dayeong (다영)
Giru (기루)
Tina (티나)
Ye-eun (예은)

Timeline

Discography

Extended plays

Singles

Music videos

Awards
2011 19th Republic of Korea Culture Entertainment Awards Idol Music Rookie of the Year

References

External links
 

K-pop music groups
2011 establishments in South Korea
English-language singers from South Korea
South Korean dance music groups
South Korean girl groups
South Korean synthpop groups
Musical groups established in 2011
Musical quintets
Musical quartets